Hincăuţi is a commune in Edineţ district, Moldova. It is composed of three villages: Clişcăuţi, Hincăuţi and Poiana.

References

Communes of Edineț District
Hotin County
Ținutul Suceava